The Texas spiny lizard (Sceloporus olivaceus) is a species of phrynosomatid lizard native to the south central United States, in the states of Texas, Arizona and Oklahoma, and northeastern Mexico in the states of Coahuila, Nuevo León, Tamaulipas, and San Luis Potosí. They are quite common throughout their range, where they can be found in trees or on fences.

Description

Patterns vary greatly by locality, but the colors and pattern typically serve to be adequate camouflage against the bark of trees in its chosen habitat. The underside is usually uniformly light grey in color, but males typically have blue patches on either side of the belly. Their scales have a distinctly spiny texture to them. They have long toes, and sharp claws suited to climbing

Reproduction 
The Texas spiny lizard will breed throughout the summer months of the year, and is capable of laying four clutches each year if nutrients are plentiful. Each clutch will contain around 20 eggs at a time, and on average the males will be larger after birth.

Behavior

The Texas spiny lizard is diurnal and arboreal. Their preferred habitat is mesquite trees, over areas with a significant amount of ground leaf litter, but they are often found in suburban areas basking on fences or climbing telephone poles.

Typically shy and nervous, when approached they will usually retreat up a tree or flee noisily through leaf litter on the ground. They are insectivorous, and eat a variety of beetles and other insects. Breeding occurs throughout the spring and summer months, and clutches of eggs can be laid as often as four times a year.

The male Texas spiny lizard also has a peculiar habit when challenged by another male for its territory. The two males will have a push-up contest, or so it seems. Both males will begin doing push-ups until one of them gives up and runs away.

In captivity
Though not normally found for sale outside of its native range, like most other Sceloporus species, the Texas spiny lizard makes an ideal choice for a small pet lizard. They are hardy, adapt easily to captivity, and readily consume commercially available crickets, though they do require specialized ultraviolet lighting.

References

BACKYARD BIODIVERSITY: Texas Spiny Lizard

Sceloporus
Reptiles of the United States
Reptiles of Mexico
Fauna of Northeastern Mexico
Reptiles described in 1934
Taxa named by Hobart Muir Smith